R Capricorni (R Cap) is a star in the constellation of Capricornus.  It has an apparent visual magnitude which varies between 9.4 and 14.9. A mira variable and ageing red giant, it is in the asymptotic giant branch stage of its lifespan.

R Capricorni is too far from earth for its parallax to be measured effectively; Guandalini and Cristallo calculated the luminosity of Mira variables based on their periods. Using a period of 345.13 days, they calculated the absolute magnitude of R Capricorni to be -4.58.

The R Capricorni is losing mass at rate of 2.8*10−6/year.

References

Capricornus (constellation)
Mira variables
Carbon stars
Capricorni, R
IRAS catalogue objects
J20111833-1416033
BD-14 5663
Emission-line stars